Saponé  is a department or commune of Bazèga Province in central Burkina Faso. Its capital lies at the town of Saponé. According to the 1996 census the department has a total population of 50,541  .

Towns and villages
Bassemyam
Bonogo

References

Departments of Burkina Faso
Bazèga Province